Kyla de Vries (born 9 November 1995) is a South African rugby sevens player. She was named in South Africa's squad for the 2022 Commonwealth Games in Birmingham, they finished in seventh place.

References 

Living people
1995 births
Female rugby sevens players
South Africa international women's rugby sevens players
Rugby sevens players at the 2022 Commonwealth Games